Earl of Berkshire is a title that has been created twice in the Peerage of England. It was created for the first time in 1621 for Francis Norris, 1st Earl of Berkshire. For more information on this creation (which became extinct on his death in 1622), see the Earl of Abingdon and also the Earl of Lindsey. The second creation came in 1626 in favour of Thomas Howard, 1st Viscount Andover. He was the second son of Thomas Howard, 1st Earl of Suffolk, second son of the second marriage of Thomas Howard, 4th Duke of Norfolk. His mother was Katherine, daughter of Sir Henry Knyvett of Charlton in Wiltshire. Howard had already been created Baron Howard of Charlton, in the County of Wiltshire, and Viscount Andover, in the County of Southampton, in 1622. These titles are also in the Peerage of England. Lord Berkshire succeeded to the Charlton estate through his mother in 1638. He was succeeded by his eldest son, the second Earl. He had already in 1640 been summoned to the House of Lords through a writ of acceleration in his father's junior title of Baron Howard of Charlton. He had no sons and on his death in 1679 the titles passed to his younger brother, the third Earl. He represented Wallingford in the House of Commons. He also died without male issue and was succeeded by his great-nephew, the fourth Earl. He was the grandson of the Hon. William Howard, fourth son of the first Earl. In 1745 he succeeded his third cousin as eleventh Earl of Suffolk. For further history of the titles, see the Earl of Suffolk.

Earls of Berkshire, First Creation (1621)
see the Earl of Abingdon and the Earl of Lindsey

Earls of Berkshire, Second Creation (1626)
Thomas Howard, 1st Earl of Berkshire (1590–1669)
Charles Howard, 2nd Earl of Berkshire (1615–1679)
Thomas Howard, 3rd Earl of Berkshire (1619–1706)
Henry Bowes Howard, 4th Earl of Berkshire (1687–1757) (succeeded as Earl of Suffolk in 1745)
see Earl of Suffolk for further succession

Notes

References 
 Kidd, Charles, Williamson, David (editors). Debrett's Peerage and Baronetage (1990 edition). New York: St Martin's Press, 1990, 

Earldoms in the Peerage of England
Extinct earldoms in the Peerage of England
Earl

Noble titles created in 1621
Noble titles created in 1626
Earls of Berkshire